Pont-Remy (also Pont-Rémy) is a commune in the Somme department in Hauts-de-France in northern France.

Geography
Pont-Remy station has rail connections to Amiens and Abbeville.

Population

Places of interest
 The railway station

  Church of Saint-Pierre
  The Château de Pont Remy Somme, also known as the Château Clochard (meaning the 'homeless man' or 'tramp' a reference to its abandoned state) or Château Pianiste (for the number of pianos left at the site).  The Château or Castle originally has been the site of numerous historical visitors including Cardinal Richelieu since its rebuilding after being destroyed during the hundred years war.An association was set up in 2007 to persuade the owners to save this historic monument.  On August 13, 2012 the Château was severely damaged by fire, halting a planned community renovation and restoration program.
 The British cemetery

See also
Communes of the Somme department

References

External links

 The British and Commonwealth Cemetery, just north of the village 

Communes of Somme (department)